The men's 200 metres event at the 2019 Asian Athletics Championships was held on 23 and 24 April 2019.

Medalists

Results

Heats
Qualification rule: First 4 in each heat (Q) and the next 4 fastest (q) qualified for the semifinals.

Wind:Heat 1: +1.3 m/s, Heat 2: +0.8 m/s, Heat 3: +2.7 m/s, Heat 4: +1.1 m/, Heat 5: +2.0 m/s

Semifinals
Qualification rule: First 2 in each heat (Q) and the next 2 fastest (q) qualified for the final.

Wind:Heat 1: +1.3 m/s, Heat 2: +0.7 m/s, Heat 3: +1.3 m/s

Final
Wind: +1.7 m/s

References

200
200 metres at the Asian Athletics Championships